OCU may mean:
 Ohio Christian University
 Oklahoma City University
 Operational Conversion Unit, a unit in an air force
 Operational Command Unit, a unit in a police force
 Operator Control Unit, a hardware or software control interface for an automated system
 One Cohesive Unit, a nickname for Annville-Cleona's men's high school soccer team
 Organizacion de Consumidores y Usuarios, a consumer organization in Spain, part of Euroconsumers
 Organized Chaos Unit, a unit of armed Citizens
 Orthodox Church of Ukraine
 Osaka City University, a public university in Osaka, Japan
 Overseas Chinese University, a university in Taichung, Taiwan